Tunari National Park is a national park located in the Cochabamba Department, Bolivia. When the Misicuni Dam floods the area, the park will also be flooded.

See also 
 Warawara Lake

References

External links 
 Parque Nacional Tunari (Fundación para el Desarrollo del Sistema Nacional de Áreas Protegidas de Bolivia) (Spanish)

National parks of Bolivia
Geography of Cochabamba Department
Protected areas established in 1992